Qian Yunhui (1957 – 25 December 2010), a 53-year-old elected and popular eastern Zhejiang province village head who had a long history of petitioning against alleged abuses by local government, died on December 25, 2010, after being crushed by the front wheel of a truck loaded with crushed rocks for a nearby building site operated by the Yueqing Electric Power Plant. Rumors emerged stating that Qian was held on the ground by four men in security personnel uniforms while the truck was driven slowly over him. A government press conference a week later announced that Qian had died in an ordinary traffic accident, struck and killed crossing the road.
An eyewitness by the name of Qian Chengwei said that he saw that four uniformed men held the victim down on the ground while the truck went on top of him. The eyewitness had since been arrested and detained by the police.
Other eyewitnesses including villager Huang Diyan, claimed she saw four uniformed men with gloves struggle with Qian and then put his body under the front tire by force.
The truck's owner/driver, Fei Liangyu was detained by the police, along with other villagers who questioned the police's investigation, including Qian's daughter.

His family was paid 1.05 million Yuan (US$159,000).

Internet response in China 
Well known Chinese online activist Wu Gan was among the first citizen reporters  to visit the crime scene, and began interviewing local eyewitness. Wu has obtained a police video of the crime scene right after the victim's dead body being removed, and had since posted the video online. Wu regularly posted comments on Twitter and other internet platforms, and with the help of a group of Chinese lawyers, is offering free legal aid to villagers in need.

Well known activist Xu Zhiyong also went to crime scene to conduct his own investigation.

References

1957 births
2010 deaths
Chinese dissidents
Human rights abuses in China